48th Street is a side platformed Sacramento RT light rail station in the Elmherst neighborhood of Sacramento, California, United States. The station was opened on July 14, 1994, and is operated by the Sacramento Regional Transit District. It is served by the Gold Line. The station is located near the intersection of 48th Street and Highway 50.

Included originally as part of the network, both this and the 39th Street station were deferred and not constructed  in 1987 due to intense neighborhood opposition. However, both would open as infill stations in July 1994 due to a shift in attitude towards the rail project following its successful opening from the surrounding neighborhoods.

Platforms and tracks

References

Sacramento Regional Transit light rail stations
Railway stations in the United States opened in 1994